Florian Jungwirth (born 27 January 1989) is a German professional former footballer who played as a defender or midfielder.

Club career

1860 Munich

Jungwirth began his career as a defender with his hometown club TSV Eintracht Karlsfeld when he was ten years old, before moving to TSV 1860 Munich, and progressing through the reserve team from age groups U-11 to U-19. He won the Deutsche Fußballmeisterschaft der B-Junioren (German B-Juniors Championship) with the U-17 team in 2006 and again in 2007 with the U-19s. Jungwirth became a member of the U-23 squad during the 2007–08 season, making his senior debut with a start on 15 September 2007 in a 3–0 victory at home against VfR Aalen. At the end of the 2009 season, he had made 48 appearances for the reserve side. He was named to the first team in the summer of 2008, but appeared only as an unused substitute eleven times during the 2008–09 season and was entirely unused for the first half of the 2009–10 season, before moving to Dynamo Dresden in January 2010.

Dynamo Dresden
Jungwirth made his debut in a 3. Fußball-Liga match during a 2–0 home win against Bayern Munich II. However, after making only eleven appearances for Dresden, he tore his cruciate ligament on 10 April 2010 during a match against FC Ingolstadt 04 and thus was sidelined until October. He helped Dresden win promotion to the 2. Bundesliga and stayed with the club, making 53 appearances over the next seasons, until his contract was up in 2013. Despite a desire to stay in Dresden, the club did not renew his contract.

VfL Bochum
Jungwirth signed with VfL Bochum in June 2013. However, due to the club's financial struggles, he moved to Darmstadt 98 in the 2014 summer transfer window.

Darmstadt 98
Jungwirth joined SV Darmstadt 98, newly promoted from the third division, in time for the 2014–15 season. He helped the club get promoted yet again, this time to the Bundesliga, and made his Bundesliga debut on opening day of the 2015–16 season against Hannover 96. He was released in January 2017 after requesting a transfer to Major League Soccer several months earlier. Darmstadt coach and former MLS player Torsten Frings tried to block his move and criticized him heavily in the media after leaving him out of the squad in what ended up being a 6–1 defeat at home to 1. FC Köln. Jungwirth responded, "Sure, the coach can criticize my training performances in public. But whether that belongs on a news conference following a 6–1 defeat where I wasn't even in the squad is anyone's guess." His signing by the San Jose Earthquakes was announced several days later.

San Jose Earthquakes

Jungwirth moved to MLS, signing a contract with the San Jose Earthquakes in February 2017. His first start for the club came on 4 March 2017 in the season-opening 1–0 home victory over the Montreal Impact. His first MLS goal was scored in stoppage time in a 2–1 road loss to Sporting Kansas City on 18 March 2017. On 14 October 2017, Jungwirth was announced as a nominee for three different league awards: the Landon Donovan MVP Award alongside teammate Chris Wondolowski, the MLS Defender of the Year Award along with teammate Nick Lima, and the MLS Newcomer of the Year Award.

Vancouver Whitecaps FC
On 6 August 2021, Jungwirth was traded to the Vancouver Whitecaps FC in exchange for $200,000 in General Allocation Money and a further $100,000 in conditional GAM. On 2 December 2021, Vancouver confirmed they had exercised his contract option, keeping him at the club through 2022.

On 27 January 2023, Jungwirth announced his retirement from playing professional footballer, and was named an assistant coach for Vancouver's first team.

International career
Jungwirth has represented Germany at various youth levels, and was the captain of the team that won the 2008 UEFA Under-19 Championship, despite being ejected from the championship game prior to half-time on a second yellow card.

Personal life
Jungwirth is known for his animal welfare work and specifically his efforts aiding the rescue of dogs from Spanish kill shelters. He has also stated that he would never play in China, because of his opposition to the annual Yulin Dog Meat Festival and general treatment of dogs in the country.

He married his wife Kathleen officially on 23 December 2015, and on 4 June 2016 they married in the church.

As of 27 February 2018, Jungwirth holds a U.S. green card, qualifying him as a domestic player for MLS roster purposes.

Career statistics

Honours
Individual
 Fritz Walter Medal Silver: 2008
 San Jose Earthquakes Defensive Player of the Year: 2017

References

External links
 
 Florian Jungwirth at MLSSoccer.com

1989 births
Living people
German footballers
Germany youth international footballers
Association football defenders
TSV 1860 Munich players
TSV 1860 Munich II players
Dynamo Dresden players
VfL Bochum players
VfL Bochum II players
SV Darmstadt 98 players
San Jose Earthquakes players
Bundesliga players
2. Bundesliga players
3. Liga players
Major League Soccer players
Vancouver Whitecaps FC players
Whitecaps FC 2 players
German expatriate sportspeople in the United States
German expatriate footballers
Expatriate soccer players in the United States
MLS Next Pro players
Vancouver Whitecaps FC non-playing staff